Chalode is a small junction town developing in Kannur, Kerala state, India.

Location 
Chalode is between Kannur, Mattannur, and Irikkur.

History
During ancient times it was the centre of travelling to Coorg, Mayyil, Irikkur, Anjarakkandy.

Etymology
The name of the town derived from charroads by northindian military forces. It was a military center, collectors camp etc. Now there is a bus stand.  Chalode was famous for black laterite stone.

Transportation
The national highway passes through Kannur town.  Goa and Mumbai can be accessed on the northern side and Cochin and Thiruvananthapuram can be accessed on the southern side.  The road to the east of Iritty connects to  Mysore, Bangalore, Virajpet, Irikkur, Sreekandapuram, Mayyil, and Kuttiyattoor. The nearest railway station is Kannur on Mangalore-Palakkad line. 
Trains are available to almost all parts of India subject to advance booking over the internet.  There are airports at Mattanur, Mangalore and Calicut. All of them are international airports but direct flights are available only to Middle Eastern countries.

References

Villages near Kannur airport